Due to the state's small size (45th of 50 by population in 2022), the politics of Delaware tend to be less convoluted and controversial than those in neighboring states. Nonetheless, Delaware's political status quo reflects the state's long history of political clout dating from the earliest days of the United States, some of which remains today. Historically, the state was considered a swing state, as it voted for the national winner all but twice between 1896 and 1996; the only exceptions being 1916 and 1948. However, in the 21st century, the state has become strongly Democratic and provided double-digit wins to Democrats since 2008. The 2008 election saw Democrat Barack Obama with a 25.0% margin of victory, the best-ever result for a Democratic presidential candidate in the state's history. Obama's large margin of victory was aided by his running mate, Joe Biden, a longtime U.S. senator from the state and the first Delawarean to appear on a national presidential ticket. Biden later went on to become the first Delawarean elected president in 2020.

Major issues 
Delaware residents as a group tend to vote toward the conservative side of moderate on fiscal and economic issues, and are more moderate on social issues. Social liberalism is generally concentrated in the northern part of the state, and conservatism is more prevalent in the less heavily populated central and southern regions. Some of the wealthiest neighborhoods around Wilmington (in the north) as well as a few of the more progressive beach towns (in the south) serve as exceptions to this general trend.  Politicians of both major parties tend to vote consistently in favor of big business, a very important sector of Delaware's economy.

Matters of perennial statewide debate tend to include taxation (which runs relatively low compared to other northeastern states); the needs and demands of Delaware's massive business community; education (Delaware's educational spending per student remains low); increasing stress on the environment; urban development and sprawl; the needs of an increasingly diverse population; large income disparities between wealthy and disadvantaged areas; and a perceived disconnect between the rural central and southern areas of the state and Wilmington and the urbanized corridor in the north, home to the bulk of the state's population.

National Politics
Delaware's situation with respect to the Presidential Primary Election changed between 2000 and 2008.  Delaware's Primary is held "on the first Tuesday in February in the calendar year of a presidential election."  In 2000, Delaware was the sole state to have a primary on February 1, while in 2004 it was one of five states with primaries on February 3.  In the 2008 primaries, Delaware shared February 5 with 23 other states on "Super Tuesday (2008)", the largest group of simultaneous primary races in the history of the United States.  Being the first Primary in the nation increases the influence of a state disproportionately in determining who the contestants will be in the general presidential election.  However, as other states change the dates of their primaries, influence is inevitably decreased.

Federal Representation
Delaware's senators in the United States Senate are Chris Coons and Tom Carper, both Democrats, serving since 2010 and 2001, respectively. Delaware's at-large representative in the United States House of Representatives is Lisa Blunt Rochester, a Democrat.

Delaware is part of the United States District Court for the District of Delaware in the federal judiciary. The district's cases are appealed to the Philadelphia-based United States Court of Appeals for the Third Circuit.

Party registration

See also
Political party strength in Delaware

Notes

References